The School of Theology and Religious Studies is one of the twelve schools at The Catholic University of America, located in Washington, D.C. and one of the three ecclesiastical schools at the university, together with the School of Canon Law and the School of Philosophy. The school is part of the main campus in the Brookland neighborhood in Northeast D.C.

On September 24, 2014, CUA president John Garvey announced that he had appointed the Very Reverend Mark Morozowich, Dean of the School of Theology and Religious Studies, as interim provost of The Catholic University of America for the remainder of the 2014-2015 academic year. Fr Morozowich has served as dean of the School of Theology and Religious Studies since July 2012. President Garvey also announced that Monsignor Paul McPartlan, the Carl J. Peter Professor of Systematic Theology and Ecumenism, had agreed to serve as the acting dean of the School of Theology and Religious studies during this interim period.

Programs of study

Undergraduate programs
Bachelor of Arts in Theology & Religious Studies
BA/MA Combination Degree Program in Theology & Religious Studies
Minor in Theology & Religious Studies
Certificate in Pastoral Ministry

Graduate programs
The School of Theology and Religious Studies offers either Civil, Ecclesiastical, or Pastoral degrees:
Civil
M.A.
Ph.D.
Ecclesiastical
S.T.B.
S.T.L.
S.T.D.
Pastoral
M.Div.
M.R.E.
D.Min.

References

External links
Official website

Colleges and schools of the Catholic University of America
Seminaries and theological colleges in Washington, D.C.